"Fly Like an Eagle" is a song written by American musician Steve Miller for the album of the same name. The song was released in the United Kingdom in August 1976 and in the United States in December 1976. It went to number two on the US Billboard Hot 100 for the week of March 12, 1977. The single edit can be found on Greatest Hits (1974–1978). The song has an unusually mellow and dreamy feel. It is usually played in tandem with "Space Intro", but the song also segues into "Wild Mountain Honey".

History
The band first performed the song in 1973 while performing at New York City's Felt Forum on a bill with The Marshall Tucker Band, Buddy Guy, and Junior Wells.

An earlier 1973 version features a more bluesy and less funk-inspired rhythm, with the guitar taking the synthesizer parts (albeit with similar delay effects). The lyrics are slightly different, indicating that the place the eagle wants to fly away from is a Native American reservation. The final, funk-inspired album version pays homage to "Slippin' into Darkness" by War (1971).

It was re-recorded for the eponymous album released in 1976.

The intro riff was first used in a slightly different form on Miller's 1969 track "My Dark Hour" (which featured Paul McCartney).

Reception
The original Steve Miller Band version sold over one million copies. The Seal version had sold over 300,000 units as of April 5, 1997.

Billboard described the Steve Miller Band version as "uncharacteristically thoughtful, but rivetingly attention grabbing." Cash Box said that the single edit "preserves the high points of the original while cutting the time just about in half."

Personnel
Steve Miller — lead vocals, guitar, ARP Odyssey
Lonnie Turner — bass
Gary Mallaber — drums
Joachim Young — B3 organ

Charts

Weekly charts

Year-end charts

Seal version

Twenty years after Miller's original version, English singer Seal covered "Fly Like an Eagle" for the soundtrack to the 1996 film Space Jam, sampling Miller's original "Space Intro" parts in the song's chorus. This version peaked at number 10 on the Billboard Hot 100 (Seal's final Hot 100 top 10 to date), number 13 on the UK Singles Chart, and number two on the Canadian RPM 100 chart.

According to Seal, the executive producer of the Space Jam soundtrack, Dominique Trenier, asked him to record it. D'Angelo, who was managed by Trenier, played keyboards on the song. Seal said that Steve Miller approved of the cover version and at one point called him "thanking me and saying that was the best cover of the song that he had heard."

Critical reception
Larry Flick from Billboard felt that the soundtrack to Space Jam "is off to a roaring start, thanks to this faithfully funky rendition of Steve Miller's classic rocker. [...] After the solemn tone of his own compositions in recent years, Seal clearly sounds like he's having a blast as he cruises through the track's rubbery bassline and space-age synths." He added, "In fact, listen closely, and you will catch him vamping a few lines from his breakthrough hit, "Crazy", toward the end." Daina Darzin from Cash Box stated that "you couldn't ask for a more perfect take on the song, which Seal makes even more spacey, swirling and effortlessly gorgeous than the original." Matt Diehl from Entertainment Weekly gave the song a B, writing, "Aside from some funky scatting and a dash of hip-hop rhythm, the soul slickster doesn't add much to Steve Miller's '70s classic-rock classic. Seal does get points for good taste in cover material, though: The song's ethereal synthesizer squiggles, wah-wah guitars, and soaring chorus sound great in the '90s. The latest fast break on the charts from the Space Jam soundtrack, it's perfect music for Michael Jordan to slam to."

Charts

Weekly charts

Year-end charts

Other cover versions
 Biz Markie sampled the song in his 1986 song, "Nobody Beats the Biz", that was released on his debut album Goin' Off (1988).
 EPMD sampled the song in the song, "You're A Customer", from the album Strictly Business (1988).
 The British dance project Habit released a groovy version of the song as a single (1990) and on their album Precious (1991).
 The Neville Brothers covered this song on their album Family Groove in 1992. Steve Miller played some guitar parts on this version.
 Deion Sanders, a former football and baseball player, sampled the song in his song “Prime Time Keeps On Ticking” from his album Prime Time (1994).
 Religious gospel singer Yolanda Adams covered the song and did the medley from her 1995 album, More Than a Melody.
 In 1998, guitarist Ed Hamilton covered the song from his album Groovology.
 American nu metal band Limp Bizkit reference the song's hook on their song "Crushed", which is featured on the soundtrack of the film End of Days (1999).
 A vocal part was sampled by Nate Dogg in Xzibit's song "Been a Long Time" on the album Restless (2000).
 Portugal. The Man covered the song for the French radio station Mouv'.
 American metal band In This Moment covered the song for their seventh album Mother.
Thundercat covered the song on the soundtrack of the film Minions: The Rise of Gru (2022).

Additional information
 The song is featured as a playable song in Rock Band 3.
 In 2012, "Fly Like an Eagle" was chosen as "the best-ever song about birds" by Birds & Blooms magazine. "We’re not at all surprised by the popularity of Steve Miller's Fly Like An Eagle with our readers," said Birds & Blooms editor Stacy Tornio in a press release. "It’s an iconic song for the iconic American bird." Other notable songs on the Birds & Blooms list were Lynyrd Skynyrd's "Free Bird" and the Beatles' "Blackbird".

References

1976 singles
1977 singles
1996 singles
1997 singles
Seal (musician) songs
Songs about birds
Steve Miller Band songs
Capitol Records singles
ZTT Records singles
Warner Records singles
Atlantic Records singles
Songs written by Steve Miller (musician)
1976 songs
Song recordings produced by Steve Miller